Otomo or Ōtomo is a Japanese surname.

People with the surname include:

 Ōtomo Chikaie (1561–1641), daimyō
 Ōtomo Chikasada (died 1570), samurai
 Ōtomo no Kuronushi (9th century), poet
 Ōtomo no Otomaro (731–809), samurai
 Ōtomo no Sakanoue no Iratsume (c. 700–750), poet
 Ōtomo Sōrin (1530–1587), daimyō who converted to Christianity
 Ōtomo no Tabito (662–731), poet
 Ōtomo no Yakamochi (718–785), waka poet
 Ai Ōtomo (born 1982), volleyball player
 Katsuhiro Otomo (born 1954), manga artist and anime director, notable for Akira and other titles
 Prince Ōtomo (Ōtomo no ōji, 648-672), 39th Emperor
 Ryūtarō Ōtomo (1912–1985), actor
 Ryūzaburō Ōtomo (born 1952), voice actor
 Satoshi Ōtomo (born 1981), Filipino-Japanese footballer
 Shohei Otomo (born 1980), artist
, Japanese ice hockey player
 Otomo Yoshihide (born 1959), experimental musician

Japanese-language surnames